Yannick Arthur Gomis (born 3 February 1992) is a Senegalese international footballer who plays for Cypriot club Aris Limassol as an attacking midfielder.

Club career
Gomis began his career in his native Senegal with Olympique de Ngor and won two caps for the Senegal national team in 2013 before joining Orléans in the summer of 2015.

On 30 June 2022, Gomis signed with Aris Limassol in Cyprus.

Career statistics

References

External links
 
 

1992 births
Living people
Senegalese footballers
Senegal international footballers
Association football midfielders
Olympique de Ngor players
US Orléans players
RC Lens players
En Avant Guingamp players
Aris Limassol FC players
Ligue 2 players
Championnat National players
Senegalese expatriate footballers
Senegalese expatriate sportspeople in France
Expatriate footballers in France
Senegalese expatriate sportspeople in Cyprus
Expatriate footballers in Cyprus